Ottmar Gerster (29 June 1897 in Braunfels, Germany – 31 August 1969 in Borsdorf) was a German viola player, conductor and composer who in 1948 became rector of the Liszt Music Academy in Weimar.

Life
Ottmar Gerster was born some 50 km (30 miles) north of Frankfurt during the closing years of the nineteenth century.   His father was a neurologist and his mother was a pianist.   He attended an Academic secondary school ("Gymnasium") and entered, in 1913, the Dr Hoch Music Conservatory where his teachers included Bernhard Sekles (improvisation) and Adolf Rebner (violin).   It was at the Hoch Conservatory that Gerster also got to know Paul Hindemith who was a near contemporary.

Between 1916 and 1918 his music education was interrupted when he was called up for military service, but he concluded his formal studies successfully in 1920.   From 1921 he was working with the Frankfurt Symphony Orchestra, initially as the Concertmaster ("leader") and the between 1923 and 1927 as a solo viola player.   During the 1920s Gerster also joined up with the labour movement and organised Workers' Choral Groups.   In addition, from 1927 till 1947 he taught at the Folkwang University of the Arts in Essen, specialising in violin, viola, chamber music, music theory and composition.

In January 1933 the NSDAP (Nazi Party) took power and quickly set about creating a one-party state out of Germany.   During the ensuing twelve years Gerster's relationship with the Hitler regime was often collaborative, but at other times problematic.   He composed a "Consecration piece" for the regime in 1933 as well as a "battle hymn" for (Nazi) German Christian organisation entitled "You should burn", setting a text by Baldur von Schirach. In 1936 there was a popular song entitled "The stranger bride" and a choral song "German airmen". In 1939, briefly, he was required to undertake "army service" as a "Road construction soldier". In 1940 he composed a song for which he had himself written the words and which was entitled "Song of the Essen Road building corps".

Gerster's Opera "The Witches of Passau" had its first performance in Düsseldorf in 1941. Further productions quickly followed in Bremen, Magdeburg, Essen und Liegnitz, and in the same year the city of Düsseldorf awarded him its version of the Robert Schumann Prize for the work.   In 1943 the National Office for Music Production (die Reichsstelle für Musikbearbeitung) gave him a 50,000 Mark contract to compose his opera "The Nutter" ("Rappelkopf") which was later renamed, less colloquially, "The enchanted self" ("Das verzauberte Ich").   During the closing period of the war Chancellor Hitler included him on the official schedule of "Divinely gifted artists", produced in August/September 1944.   This listed more than 1,000 people from the arts establishment who on account of their cultural value should be kept away from involvement in fighting even, as the enemy armies advanced, on the home front.   Around this time Gerster returned to Essen where he lived till 1947.

In May 1945 the war ended and Gerster found himself on the blacklist of the occupying American army. He nevertheless continued to lecture in Essen till 1947 which was the year in which he relocated from the British occupation zone to the Soviet occupation zone. The Soviet zone was by now in the process of  being transformed into the German Democratic Republic (East Germany).   In 1947 he joined the new country's newly formed Socialist Unity Party of Germany (SED / Sozialistische Einheitspartei Deutschlands). In 1947 he accepted a professorship in composition and music theory at the Franz Liszt Music Academy in Weimar, where between 1948 and 1951 he was the rector.   In 1950 he was a founding member of the East German Cultural Academy.   In 1951 he left Weimar and took a position at what was then called the Mendelssohn Music Academy in Leipzig, where he remained till his retirement in 1962.

Between 1951 and 1968 Gerster was Chairman of the country's Association of Composers and Musicologists.

Style
Gerster was a relatively traditional composer.   He stuck to the framework of conventional extended tonality, often using church music modes, essentially building his chord structures on fourths and fifths.   His works were mostly classical in their architecture:  he made extensive use of Sonata form.   Like many composers at this time he felt an affinity with folk songs, from which his music sometimes incorporates melodies.   There is also a stress on a "hand-crafted" element in his tonality.   Gerster was an early exponent of music for the masses and had no difficulty in accommodating his work to the guidelines of Socialist realism on which, at least during the early 1950s, the state insisted.   There is frequently a certain amount of neo-classicism injected, but Gerster is also able to write with great pathos.   Sometimes his style resembles that of his student contemporary, Paul Hindemith.

Awards and honours 
 1926: Schott Music prize
 1941: Robert Schumann Prize of the city of Düsseldorf
 1951: National Prize of East Germany Class 2 for culture and literature
 1962: Patriotic Order of Merit in Silver
 1967: National Prize of East Germany Class 1 for culture and literature

Compositions 
 Orchestral works
 Symphony Nr.1 Kleine Sinfonie (1933/34)
 Symphony Nr.2 Thüringische Sinfonie (1949–52)
 Symphony Nr.3 Leipziger Sinfonie mit Schlusschor (1964/65, 2. Fassung 1966)
 Symphony Nr.4 Weimarer Sinfonie (nur 1. Satz vollendet, 1969. for 20th anniversary of the GDR)
 Oberhessische Bauerntänze (1938)
 Festive Toccata (1941/42)
 Festival Overture 1948 (1948)
 Dresdener Suite (1956)
 Concertos
 Piano concerto in A (1931, rev. 1955)
 Violin concerto (1939)
 Concertino for Viola and Chamber orchestra op.16 (ca. 1928)
 'Cello concerto in D (vor 1946)
 Horn concerto (1958)
 Capriccietto for four kettle drums and String orchestra (ca. 1932)
 Opera
 Madame Liselotte, Oper (1932/33; UA 21. Oktober 1933, Essen)
 Enoch Arden oder Der Möwenschrei, Opera (1935/36; UA 15. November 1936, Düsseldorf; Text: Karl Michael Freiherr von Levetzow)
 Die Hexe von Passau, Oper (1939–41; UA 11. Oktober 1941, Düsseldorf)
 Das verzauberte Ich, Oper (1943–48, UA 1949, Wuppertal)
 Der fröhliche Sünder, Oper (1960–62)
Various vocal works
 Das Lied vom Arbeitsmann (1928)
 Der geheimnisvolle Trompeter, Kantate (1928)
 Wir!, sozialistisches Festspiel (1931/32)
 Ihr sollt brennen, Kampfchoral der Deutschen Christen (Text: Baldur von Schirach, 1933)
 Gedenket ihrer, Kantate für Sopran, Sprecher, Männerchor und Orchester (1939, for Nazi Heroes Day)
 Eisenkombinat Ost, Kantate (1951)
 Sein rotes Banner, Song to Karl Marx (1954)
 Ballade vom Manne Karl Marx und der Veränderung der Welt (Text: Walther Victor, 1958)
 zahlreiche Chöre
 Lieder
 Volksliedbearbeitungen
 Chamber music
 String quartet Nr.1 in D (1920/21)
 String quartet Nr.2 in C (1954)
 String trio op.42 (ca. 1922)
 String sextet in c op.5 (1921/22)
 Sonata for Violin and Piano (1950/51)
 Sonata for Viola and Piano Nr.1 in D (1919–22)
 Sonata for Viola and Piano Nr.2 in F (1954/55)
 Higs quartet for 4 double basses (1932)
 Sonatine for Oboe and Piano (1969)
 Works for Accordion
 Piano music
 Phantasie in G op.9 (1922)
 Sonatine (1922/23)
 other small pieces

References

German classical composers
German male classical composers
20th-century classical composers
German classical violists
German male conductors (music)
German classical musicians
Education in Weimar
Academic staff of the University of Music and Theatre Leipzig
Recipients of the Patriotic Order of Merit
Recipients of the National Prize of East Germany
Socialist Unity Party of Germany members
1897 births
1969 deaths
20th-century German conductors (music)
20th-century German male musicians
20th-century German composers
20th-century violists